Kelly Wayne Gruber (born February 26, 1962) is a former Major League Baseball (MLB) third baseman.

Early life
Gruber was born on February 26, 1962. Gruber played baseball at Westlake High School in Austin, Texas, where his number was later retired.

Early career
He was drafted by the Cleveland Indians in the 1st round (10th pick) of the 1980 amateur draft but did not sign with the team. On December 5, 1983, the Toronto Blue Jays picked him up in the Rule 5 draft. Gruber saw his first MLB action shortly thereafter, playing in his first game on April 20, 1984.  Over the next three seasons, he split time between MLB and the minor leagues, earning an everyday spot in the Toronto line-up by 1987.  The Toronto media quickly nicknamed him "Xanthos" (meaning blonde) after his long flowing blonde hair.  During his stay in Toronto he was voted the city's most eligible bachelor.

Best years
On April 16, 1989, Gruber was the first Blue Jay in history to hit for the cycle when he got four hits in six at–bats with six RBI and four runs scored. His cycle occurred in the following order: home run, double, triple, and single.  He was told to stop at first for his single even though a double was easily attainable.
Gruber had his best season in 1990, hitting .274 with 31 home runs, 118 RBIs and 14 stolen bases, winning Gold Glove and Silver Slugger awards and ending up fourth in MVP balloting that year.

Gruber was a member of the 1992 World Series-winning Blue Jay team, and was involved in one of the most controversial plays in World Series history.  In the fourth inning of Game 3, Gruber appeared to make a diving tag on Braves runner Deion Sanders' foot to record the third out of a triple play, which would have been only the second such play in World Series history.  However, the second-base umpire ruled Sanders safe.  Gruber tore his rotator cuff on the play; however, he hit a key game-tying home run in the eighth inning, and the Jays won the game in walk-off fashion, later taking the series in six games.

Later career
Gruber was traded to the California Angels for Luis Sojo in December 1992. Soon after his arrival, Gruber announced that he had bulging discs in his neck. Just over two months after the trade, Gruber had shoulder surgery to repair a rotator cuff tear. Gruber was expected to be sidelined for at least eight weeks. Angels manager Buck Rodgers was angered over the news of Gruber's surgery; he felt that the Blue Jays must have known about the extent of Gruber's injury before they traded him. Rodgers said that Rene Gonzales would be the team's third baseman that year.

Gruber returned to action in June, but after playing in only 18 games, Gruber went back on the disabled list with continued neck and shoulder problems the next month. In September, the team placed Gruber on waivers. He was owed $4 million for the 1993 season, but the Blue Jays agreed to pay $1.7 million of that total.

In 1997, Gruber attempted a comeback with the Baltimore Orioles. While his performance was good enough to impress coaches and staff with the Orioles, Gruber decided to retire for good due to health-related concerns.

See also
 List of Major League Baseball players to hit for the cycle

Personal
Gruber makes public appearances as a motivational speaker for charitable organizations and holds baseball seminars throughout North America.

On June 16, 2018, he made numerous controversial and offensive remarks at a PitchTalks event in Toronto, some directed at moderator Ashley Docking, prompting his uninviting from the upcoming Canadian Baseball Hall of Fame festivities. 

In 1992, Gruber published his autobiography, Kelly, At Home on Third.

References

Further reading

External links
, or Retrosheet
Pelota Binaria (Venezuelan Winter League)
Kelly Gruber's Baseball Camp website
Kelly Gruber's website 

1962 births
Living people
American expatriate baseball players in Canada
American League All-Stars
Baseball players from Houston
Batavia Trojans players
Buffalo Bisons (minor league) players
California Angels players
Cardenales de Lara players
American expatriate baseball players in Venezuela
Chattanooga Lookouts players
Gold Glove Award winners
Major League Baseball third basemen
Palm Springs Angels players
Rochester Red Wings players
Silver Slugger Award winners
Syracuse Chiefs players
Toronto Blue Jays players
Vancouver Canadians players
Waterloo Indians players
Westlake High School (Texas) alumni